Stanmore is a town in the London Borough of Harrow.

Stanmore may also refer to:

 Stanmore, New South Wales
Stanmore, Queensland
 Stanmore, Winchester, a suburb of Winchester, Hampshire
 Stanmore (New Zealand electorate)
 Little Stanmore
 Frank Stanmore (disambiguation), multiple people
 Stanmore tube station,  a London Underground and terminus for the Jubilee line, formerly the Bakerloo line

See also
Stanmer
Stainmore